Americium oxide may refer to:
 Americium dioxide
 Americium(III) oxide

See also
 Americium(III) hydroxide